

History 
In 1973, the Charles River Rugby Football Club, affectionately dubbed "The Rats", was founded by a group of ruggers from Tufts University and Boston Rugby Football Club. In striking green and orange jerseys that quickly became the club's trademark, the Rats achieved many early successes, including winning the Portland RFC Invitational and advancing to the Annual New England Tournament semi-finals. The Rats continued to attract new players and build on each year's accomplishments over the next decade, thus solidifying themselves as a fixture in the New England rugby community.

In 1980, the Rats earned promotion to New England Division I thanks to a staggering defeat of the renowned Berlin Strollers. The early eighties were busy for the club, as the men concentrated on augmenting club membership via a merger with the Old North Bridge RFC of Concord, MA. Highlights of the eighties include continual success both in New England and in international tournament play. In 1985, Charles River placed 2nd in NERFU Division I, qualifying them for the national playoffs: the team defeated Binghamton RFC in the first round, then lost to Old Blue RFC of NYC (16-6), which ended up advancing to the national finals.  In the fall of 1986, the club defeated Boston RFC 12-9, eliminating them from the playoffs for the first time in 5 years.

The Club settled into a restructured Division II in 1992 and proceeded to hold the top seed in that division from 1993 to 1994, running three winning seasons in a row.

The club failed to post a winning season again until the fall of 2005 when the men's side, under coach Fergal Hehir, made it to the playoffs. They defeated Rockaway RFC in the first playoff game in the spring of 2006 and lost to Montauk RFC in the second game. Under Hehir's tenure, Charles River's men's side ran four winning seasons in a row. In 2008, Hehir stepped down and the following January, the club came under the direction of Anthony Adams former player with the Boston Irish Wolfhounds RFC.

After going winless in Adams' first league season (fall 2009), the Rat's men's side was almost relegated down to Division III, but managed to argue their case to stay in Division II.  They were put in the new Daly Conference of Division II. In 2010, another South African, Hylton Haynes, took over as Men's coach.

Currently, the Rat's men's side competes in Division III. In fall of 2017 they beat out Old Gold RFC to earn a spot in playoffs, the first time in over 10 years. Playoffs begin in Spring 2018.

2005 also marked the first season of the Lady Rats, a women's team to complement the men's team. The women had a successful winning first season, fielding a competitive side in all of their matches. In 2007, they went undefeated in Division III and were promoted to Division II. In the NERFU realignment in 2009, they were placed in Division III. In May 2011, they won the Division III championship. Since then, and multiple NERFU realignments, Charles River Women's RFC is currently competing in DII. In 2017 they made the playoffs for the second time in their history, and fell in the second round.

The Rats men's side has been running about 50 active players per season and the women's side has been running about 40 players.

Division 
The Charles River Lady Rats are a part of the New England Rugby Football Union, Senior Women's Division II. In this division, they compete with:
Burlington WRFC
Hartford Wild Roses
Providence WRFC
Worcester WRFC
Portland, Maine (PWRFC)
North Shore Monsoons WRFC
Upper Valley WRFC

The Charles River Rats are a part of the New England Rugby Football Union, Senior Men's Division III in the Northern Conference. In this division, they compete with:
 Mad River RFC
 North Shore RFC
 Boston B RFC
 Freedom RFC
 Boston Maccabi RFC
 Springfield Rifles RFC

During their history, they have merged with the following clubs while retaining the name Charles River:
 Old North Bridge RFC (1981)(based in Concord, MA)
 Hanscom Hawks RFC (1987) (based on Hanscom AFB)
 Dracut RFC (1995)

1973 establishments in Massachusetts
Rugby clubs established in 1973
Rugby union teams in Boston
South Boston